Ali Shahbazi is the former commander-in-chief of the Iranian Army.

Career
Shahbazi was appointed by Rafsanjani as the chief of staff of the Iranian Armed Forces Joint Staff on 7 May 1988. Shahbazi was the first commander-in-chief of the Iranian Army. He was succeeded by major general Mohammad Salimi when he resigned from office in May 2000. Then he became the head of the Trusted University Council for National Defense and chief military advisor of Ali Khamenei.

See also 
 List of Iranian two-star generals since 1979

References

Living people
Islamic Republic of Iran Army major generals
Commander-in-Chiefs of Islamic Republic of Iran Army
People from Qom
1937 births